The Infinity Fort Bonifacio is a mixed-use skyscraper under construction in     Bonifacio Global City, Taguig, Metro Manila, Philippines. Although no exact height details was disclosed, it is found to have a height of 189.8 metres (622.70 feet), and has 48 floors above ground level. It was proclaimed by its developer, Nuvoland Philippines Inc., that it will be the tallest structure in Bonifacio Global City by Dec. 2011 surpassing Pacific Plaza Towers after 10 years as a tallest building.

The Infinity Fort Bonifacio was designed by Abigail Pangilinan of Recio + Casas Architects, while the project construction management is handled by S.P. Castro Inc. The building is being constructed by China State Construction Engineering Corp.

See also
 List of tallest buildings in Metro Manila

References

External links
 The Infinity Fort Bonifacio @ Condo.Com.Ph

Skyscrapers in Bonifacio Global City
Residential skyscrapers in Metro Manila
Residential buildings completed in 2011
Skyscraper office buildings in Metro Manila
Office buildings completed in 2011